Sun Valley Lake is an unincorporated community and census-designated place in Ringgold County, Iowa, United States. Its population was 161 as of the 2010 census. The community is located in northeastern Ringgold County on the shores of its namesake lake.

Geography

Demographics

References

Census-designated places in Iowa
Census-designated places in Ringgold County, Iowa